Volga is a bandy club from Ulyanovsk, Russia.  Volga currently plays in the Russian Bandy Super League, the highest division of Russian bandy.

The team was founded in 1934 and has played in the top division of Soviet and Russian bandy championships since 1959. In 2014 they got the indoor Volga-Sport-Arena. This arena hosted all but two games at the  2016 World Championship.

Sources

External links 
 bandysidan 
 Club website
 Image of the 2017-18 team

 
Bandy clubs in Russia
Bandy clubs in the Soviet Union
Bandy clubs established in 1934
Sport in Ulyanovsk